Crime Traveller is a 1997 science fiction detective television series produced by Carnival Films for the BBC based on the premise of using time travel for the purpose of solving crimes.

Anthony Horowitz created the series and wrote every episode. He got the idea while writing an episode of Poirot. Despite having over eight million viewers on a regular basis, Crime Traveller was not renewed after its first series, because according to Horowitz, "The show wasn't exactly cut. There was a chasm at the BBC, created by the arrival of a new Head of Drama and our run ended at that time. There was no-one around to commission a new series...and so it just didn't happen.".

Plot
Jeff Slade is a detective with the Criminal Investigation Department of the local police force led by Kate Grisham; although unusually for such a position he is an armed officer, carrying a handgun as routine. Slade is a good detective who gets results although his approach is somewhat maverick and his methods do leave a lot to be desired and have more than once landed him in trouble. Amongst Slade's colleagues at the department is science officer Holly Turner who has a secret that Slade manages to uncover. Holly owns a working time machine that was built by her late father. The machine is able to take Slade and Holly back far enough in time to witness a crime as it happens and discover who committed it. As a result, Slade's track record with crime solving goes through the roof with case after case being solved in record time.

Characters
 Jeff Slade (Michael French) — Slade is not what could be described as a conventional detective. His style is maverick to say the least and he is more prone to go on instinct rather than cold hard facts. This approach invariably gets him in trouble with his superiors but nine times out of ten they will result in an arrest. Slade clearly enjoys his job and is very dedicated to it even though his attitude sometimes suggests otherwise. He was inspired to join the police because of his father Jack who was a highly respected detective himself until his false arrest and imprisonment for theft in 1992. Jeff took this very hard as he had always admired his father and refused to believe he was capable of such a thing following such a distinguished 30-year career. Slade was once married but very little is known about how long he was married and indeed how the marriage ended but it is thought that his wife died as he keeps a picture in his flat of a girl he tells Holly is now dead. Outside work Slade tends to keep himself to himself and rarely if ever socialises with colleagues such as Morris and Nicky. His only real friend at work is science officer Holly Turner. They have clearly always been on friendly terms but it is suggested that before her telling him about the machine they didn't socialise outside of work. Since his finding out about the machine the two have become a lot closer and spend a lot of time together outside work. It is hinted throughout the series that Slade is attracted to Holly but for whatever reason he has never seen fit to tell her how he feels. As well as making them closer personally their use of the machine has also shown that professionally they are a very good team and together they have solved several crimes including who set up Slade's father five years before and getting him released.
 Holly Turner (Chloë Annett) — Holly is the daughter of Professor Frederick Turner, a prominent physicist whose specialist field was that of time travel. After years of research and work, Turner was able to develop a working time machine. Turner used the machine to carry out experiments on time and the laws and rules by which it abides, such as 'you can't change the past' and 'time won't allow paradoxes'. The only other person Turner ever told about the machine was his daughter Holly. When Turner failed to return to the machine in time on his last trip and was trapped in a loop of infinity, Holly took over work on the machine and continued to maintain and perfect it to continue his experiments. To do so, Holly needed money but she didn't dare apply for a grant for fear of someone discovering the machine. So, she went to work for the CID as a science officer and it was there that she met detective Jeff Slade. The two were friendly from the start but when Holly used the machine to help Slade out after a case had gone badly wrong and got Slade in trouble, Slade found out about the machine. This resulted in their relationship becoming closer and they began spending time together outside work. Holly is clearly attracted to Slade as he is to her but like him, she chooses not to reveal this to him, probably because she thinks that if the machine were not around then Slade wouldn't give her a second glance. Like Slade, Holly tends to keep herself to herself, possibly more so than he does because she is so terrified that someone may find out about the machine. Whilst she feels that Slade relies too much on the machine to solve his cases, she does seem to like having someone to talk to about the machine and she no longer has to keep all the financial worries that its upkeep brings completely to herself.

Cast
 Michael French as DI Jeff Slade — City detective, and the only person other than Holly who knows about the time machine.
 Chloë Annett as Holly Turner — Forensic scientist whose father invented the time machine, which she keeps and adjusts in her apartment.
 Sue Johnston as DCI Kate Grisham — Slade's irritable boss whom, thanks to his methods, he is constantly getting on the wrong side of.
 Paul Trussell as DS Morris — Slade's slow-witted colleague, who usually takes the credit for his success.
 Richard Dempsey as DC Nicky Robson — A posh, intelligent but naïve trainee detective, too helpful and trusting for his own good.
 Bob Goody as Danny — Caretaker at Holly's apartment block, who is constantly having to deal with the power outages caused by Holly and Slade's use of the time machine.

Episodes

Home media
Revelation Films released the entire series on DVD on 21 June 2004.

The DVD Box Set includes an exclusive interview with writer and creator Anthony Horowitz. DVD Special Features also include; Cast and Crew Biographies, Episode Synopsis and Original Production Trailer.

See also
Quantum Leap, an American science fiction show involving time travel to fix the past; this often involves crime solving.
Seven Days, an American science fiction show in which a government-controlled machine can send one man a week back in time, though the expense means that it is only used to avert serious disasters; this can involve stopping criminals or terrorists.
Timecop, a 1994 science-fiction film starring Jean-Claude Van Damme as a time-travelling police officer.

References

External links
Crime Traveller fan site

Crime Traveller at the Internet Movie Database.
Action TV Crime Traveller page

BBC television dramas
British science fiction television shows
British time travel television series
1997 British television series debuts
1997 British television series endings
1990s British drama television series
Television shows written by Anthony Horowitz
Television series produced at Pinewood Studios
British detective television series
English-language television shows
1990s British crime television series
1990s British science fiction television series
1990s British mystery television series